Santa Paws 2: The Santa Pups is a 2012 Christmas adventure film directed by Robert Vince and produced by Anna McRoberts. It is the sequel to The Search for Santa Paws (2010). The Santa Pups save Christmas around the world. The film was released by Walt Disney Studios Home Entertainment on DVD, Blu-ray, and as a movie download on November 20, 2012.

Plot
Mrs. Paws has just given birth to four adorable puppies named Hope, Jingle, Charity and Noble. Four months later, the Santa Pups each have their own personalities. Hope is always ready to take action wherever she goes, but never takes caution. Jingle loves to sing, but she can only sing off-key. Charity still needs to learn how to share, and Noble pretends to be the leader of his sisters, and leads them into trouble. Meanwhile, in school, Noble asks Eli and Eddy if they can have their own magic crystals, but they have to understand the True Meaning of Christmas to earn one. The Santa Pups are then taken on a field trip to the cave of the Great Christmas Icicle, where they learn how magic is used, and how the Christmas Magic in the icicle is used to power the magic crystals. They see on the spirit map that Christmas spirit is highest in Pineville, USA (in Montana, according to the spirit map; it could be Hot Springs, and this town is originally platted as Pineville) where they learn an ambassador named Michelle Reynolds has recently passed away.

In Pineville, every citizen is overly ecstatic about Christmas, including Michelle's widowed husband Thomas and their 7 year old daughter Sarah. However, their 12 year old son Carter has lost his Christmas spirit after his mother's passing and has now become apathetic and cold-hearted.

When Mrs. Claus prepares to go to Pineville to find a new Santa Claus ambassador, Noble comes up with a plan of his own. His plan is to take Eddy's magic crystal collar, and then fly to Pineville to prove that they are ready for their own crystals. Once in Pineville, Noble begins granting the first Christmas wish to a girl named Taylor who wishes to skate really well, and then to another girl named Sally who wishes for her two front teeth. But, after a furious Carter wishes for the Christmas spirit to disappear, Noble ends up granting a terrible Christmas wish that then affects all of the people in town. Everyone who Carter meets loses their kindness and Christmas spirit. The Santa Pups then meet a new friend Baxter, who his owner Jeb Gibson, is actually a dog catcher, and after being affected by Carter's wish, loses his kindness to animals and catches the Santa Pups and takes them to the pound.

The Santa Pups then explain that if they don't get the crystal back and reverse the wish, Christmas could be in big trouble. The Santa Pups then try to retrieve the crystal with help from Hope, but Hope is not careful on the descent, and accidentally wakes up Brutus. Brutus explains that his life has been pretty rough due to his owner having lost the Christmas Spirit. The Santa Pups agree to get Santa to take him off the Naughty List. Mrs. Claus, Carter, Sarah, the pups, and three sisters named Agnes, Dorothy and Blue, that Mrs. Claus met, try to bring the Christmas spirit back forever. They do this by airing on the radio and convincing everyone to act like normal. Carter wishes for the Christmas spirit to last forever all over the world. The pups are then able to reverse the wish. Noble gives Eddy his magic crystal collar, and then the Santa Pups, Eli, Eddy, and Mrs. Claus head back to the North Pole. The film ends with the Santa Pups, Eddy and Eli singing about what the True Meaning of Christmas is all about.

Cast
 Cheryl Ladd as Mrs. Claus
 George Newbern as Thomas Reynolds, Sarah and Carter's caring widowed father who is a lawyer.
 Danny Woodburn as Eli, Santa's head elf. 
 Obba Babatundé as Mayor Denny, the mayor of Pineville. 
 Kaitlyn Maher as Sarah Reynolds, a sweet, loving 7-year-old girl who has the most Christmas spirit.
 Josh Feldman as Carter Reynolds, a 12-year-old boy who is Sarah's big brother, who has lost his Christmas spirit ever since his mother Michelle died of cancer. 
 Ali Hillis, Jennifer Elise Cox and Audrey Wasilewski as the Bright Sisters, Agnes, Blue and Dorothy.
 Jed Rees as Roland.
 Bill Chott as Mr. Holman, a Christmas cookie baker.
 Paul Rae as Jeb Gibson, Thomas' brother and Sarah and Carter's paternal uncle who owns the local dog shelter.
 Brian T. Finney as Sheriff Andy
 Ted Rooney as Mr. Miller
 Pat Finn as Santa Claus
 Tatiana Gudegast as Sally

Voice cast
 Aidan Gemme as Noble, the only boy and eldest Santa Pup and the irresponsible leader of the Santa Pups.
 Tatiana Gudegast as Hope, one of the elder Santa Pups and tiniest of the siblings who is always ready to take action, but never thinks beforehand.
 G. Hannelius as Charity, the youngest Santa Pup who enjoys getting stuff for herself and still needs to live up to her name. She previously was Janie, one of the orphans in the previous film as a human girl and not a voice actor. 
 Marlowe Peyton as Jingle, one of the younger Santa Pups who loves to sing but can only sing off-key. 
 Richard Kind as Eddy, a happy-go-lucky elf dog Jack Russell Terrier who is Eli's assistant.
 Diedrich Bader as Comet, one of Santa's reindeer. 
 Chris Coppola as Dancer, another one of Santa's reindeer. Coppola played Gus in the previous film.
 Josh Flitter as Brutus, a gruff bulldog who befriends the Santa Pups in hope of getting off of Santa's naughty list. Flitter voiced T-Money in the previous film.
 Trevor Wright as Baxter, the Santa Pups newest friend. He is a Schnauzer mix.
 Tom Everett Scott as Santa Paws, husband to Mrs. Paws and father to the Santa Pups. 
 Bonnie Somerville as Mrs. Paws, wife to Santa Paws and mother to the Santa Pups, she only appears in the first scene of the movie.

Release

Home media
Santa Paws 2: The Santa Pups was released on DVD, Blu-ray, and as a movie download on November 20, 2012. The physical release was produced in 2 different packages: a 2-disc Blu-ray / DVD combo pack and a 1-disc DVD. The movie download was produced in both standard and high definition. Bonus features for the release included a music video for "Santa Pups Music Mash-Up" and "Blooper Scooper".

Reception
The film has met extremely negative reviews, with critics stating that it had a dark tone and a weak plotline. Film critic Thomas Richards has noted the low quality voice acting. He also criticized the choice to eliminate actors from the original film such as the one who played Santa, as well as reusing old ones such as Kaitlyn Maher. Film critic Frank Smith said that Disney's overuse of dogs was annoying, and said that the humor in the film was "forced, and unnatural". At Typhoon Critics, the film holds 2.5 stars out of 10.

See also
Santa Paws
Santa Claus in film
 List of Christmas films

References

External links
 
 
 

2012 direct-to-video films
American direct-to-video films
2010s English-language films
American Christmas comedy films
Direct-to-video sequel films
Disney direct-to-video films
American children's comedy films
Canadian direct-to-video films
Canadian Christmas comedy films
Canadian children's comedy films
Films about dogs
Films directed by Robert Vince
Air Bud (series)
2010s Christmas films
2012 films
2010s Canadian films
2010s American films